Brett William Collins (born October 8, 1968) is a former linebacker in the National Football League who played for the Green Bay Packers and the Los Angeles Rams.
Collins played collegiate ball for the University of Washington before being drafted by the Packers in the 12th round of the 1992 NFL Draft.  He played professionally for 3 seasons from 1992 to 1994.

References

1968 births
People from Sheridan, Wyoming
Players of American football from Wyoming
Washington Huskies football players
Green Bay Packers players
Los Angeles Rams players
Living people